The Anglican Diocese of Jebba is one of eight within the Anglican Province of Kwara, itself one of 14 provinces within the Church of Nigeria. The current bishop is Oluwaseun Aderogba, who succeeded Timothy Adewole.

Notes

Church of Nigeria dioceses
Dioceses of the Province of Kwara